The 1988 Bristol City Council election took place on 5 May 1988 to elect members of Bristol City Council in England. This was on the same day as other local elections. One third of seats were up for election. This was the first election following the merger of the Liberal Party and SDP to form the Social & Liberal Democrats. There were also several candidates representing the continuing SDP. There was a general small swing to Labour.

Ward results

The change is calculated using the results when these actual seats were last contested, i.e. the 1984 election.

Avonmouth

The Conservatives won Avonmouth in a by-election in 1987 and lost the seat back to Labour at this election.

Bishopston

Bishopsworth

Brislington East

Brislington West

Clifton

Cotham

Hartcliffe

Henbury

Hengrove

Henleaze

Horfield

Kingsweston

Knowle

Redland

St George East

St George West

Southmead

Stockwood

Stoke Bishop

Westbury-on-Trym

Whitchurch Park

Windmill Hill

Sources
 Bristol Evening Post 6 May 1988

1988
1988 English local elections
1980s in Bristol